The monetary policy reaction function is a function that gives the value of a monetary policy tool that a central bank chooses, or is recommended to choose, in response to some indicator of economic conditions.

Examples

One such reaction function is the Taylor rule. It specifies the nominal interest rate set by the central bank in reaction to the inflation rate, the assumed long-term real interest rate, the deviation of the inflation rate from its desired value, and the log of the ratio of real GDP (output) to potential output.

Alternatively, Ben Bernanke and Robert H. Frank present the function, in its simplest form, as an upward-sloping relationship between the real interest rate and the inflation rate:

r = r* + g(π – π*)

where

r	= current target real interest rate
r*	= long-run target for the real interest rate
g	= constant term (or the slope of the MPRF)
π	= actual inflation rate
π*	= long-run target for the inflation rate

References 

Monetary policy